Wreck-It Ralph is a 2012 American computer-animated comedy film produced by Walt Disney Animation Studios and released by Walt Disney Pictures. The 52nd Disney animated feature film, it was directed by Rich Moore (in his feature directorial debut) and produced by Clark Spencer, from a screenplay written by Phil Johnston and Jennifer Lee, and a story by Moore, Johnston, and Jim Reardon. John Lasseter served as the film’s executive producer. Featuring the voices of John C. Reilly, Sarah Silverman, Jack McBrayer, and Jane Lynch, the film tells the story of the eponymous arcade game villain who rebels against his "bad-guy" role and dreams of becoming a hero.

Wreck-It Ralph premiered at the El Capitan Theatre in Los Angeles on October 29, 2012, and went into general release on November 2. The film was a critical and commercial success, grossing $496 million worldwide against a $165 million budget and winning the Annie Award for Best Animated Feature, as well as receiving nominations for the Golden Globe and Academy Award for Best Animated Feature, losing both awards to Brave. A sequel, Ralph Breaks the Internet, was released on November 21, 2018.

Plot

Whenever Litwak's Arcade closes, the various video game characters leave their in-game roles and socialize via a power strip called Game Central Station. Wreck-It Ralph, the villain of platformer game Fix-it Felix, Jr., visits a villain support group called Bad-Anon and expresses frustration with his assigned role. When Ralph is excluded and ostracized from his game's 30th anniversary party, he decides to win a medal and earn respect. Upon overhearing that one can earn medals in a first-person shooter called Hero's Duty, Ralph sneaks in and steals one while the characters fight insectoid monsters known as Cy-Bugs. Ralph accidentally launches himself in an escape shuttle with a Cy-Bug inside and crash-lands in the confectionery-themed kart racing game Sugar Rush. With Ralph gone, his game is labeled out of order, threatening the livelihoods of everyone in Fix-it Felix Jr.. Felix, the titular protagonist, leaves the game to find Ralph, allying with Sergeant Calhoun, the heroine of Hero's Duty, as she tracks the Cy-Bug, which may become a virus outside the game.

In Sugar Rush, a girl named Vanellope von Schweetz steals Ralph's medal and uses it to buy her way into the nightly race that determines which characters will be playable the next day. King Candy, the ruler of Sugar Rush world, forbids her to race, as she has a glitch that causes her to move and teleport erratically. Vanellope promises to get the medal back if Ralph helps her win; he helps her build a new kart and teaches her to drive inside Diet Cola Mountain. Calhoun and Felix arrive in Sugar Rush, where they fall into a  Nesquik-sand, work together to escape, and begin to fall in love. Meanwhile, Candy hacks into Sugar Rush source code and retrieves the medal, giving it back to Ralph. He claims that if Vanellope becomes a playable character, her glitching may lead to the game being labeled out of order and unplugged. Ralph decides he cannot allow Vanellope to race and destroys her kart. Calhoun abandons Felix when he inadvertently reminds her of her late fiancé who was killed by a Cy-Bug during their wedding, by calling her his "dynamite gal"; Felix is imprisoned by Candy's assistant, Sour Bill, while Calhoun discovers that the Cy-Bug has multiplied exponentially.

A despondent Ralph returns to Fix-it Felix, Jr. and learns from Mayor Gene about the game’s fate. He notices that the Sugar Rush cabinet displays Vanellope as an actual playable character. Suspecting that Candy has deceived him, he returns to Sugar Rush and interrogates Bill, who admits that Candy erased Vanellope's code and locked away the memories of the game's characters so that nobody would know her actual role. He explains that if Vanellope completes a race, all of Candy's changes will be deleted and the game will reset, meaning Vanellope will no longer be a glitch. Ralph frees Felix from Candy's prison, repairs the kart, and reconciles with Vanellope, who enters the race. During the race, the Cy-Bugs emerge and start destroying the game; Calhoun, Felix, and Ralph help evacuate the characters. 

Unaware of this development, Candy attempts to ram Vanellope off the track, causing them both to glitch. Their glitching inadvertently reveals Candy to be Turbo, a video game character who secretly took over Sugar Rush after he inadvertently caused his own game, TurboTime, to be unplugged. Vanellope flees as Turbo is devoured by a Cy-Bug, which fuses with him into an insectoid monster. Everyone but Vanellope evacuates, as glitches cannot leave their games. Remembering from Hero's Duty that a beacon will draw and destroy the Cy-Bugs, Ralph battles Turbo and collapses the Mentos roof of Diet Cola Mountain, creating a glowing eruption which lures and destroys Turbo and the Cy-Bugs. Vanellope rescues Ralph and crosses the finish line. The game resets, revealing her as the true ruler of Sugar Rush, though she keeps her glitching ability, considering it an advantage.

Ralph returns to his game, content with his role as a villain and respected by his fellow characters. Felix and Calhoun marry, and Ralph watches Vanellope become Sugar Rush favorite character.

Cast

 John C. Reilly as Ralph, a gigantic but soft-hearted man who is the villain of the fictional arcade game Fix-It Felix Jr.
 Sarah Silverman as Vanellope von Schweetz, a racer/glitch in Sugar Rush.
 Jack McBrayer as Felix, a repairman who is the hero of Fix-It Felix Jr.
 Jane Lynch as Sergeant Tamora Jean Calhoun, the lead character of Hero's Duty.
 Alan Tudyk as King Candy, the ruler of Sugar Rush who is revealed to be Turbo, an infamous character from another kart racing video game, TurboTime known for having crashed Roadblasters out of jealousy. King Candy's vocal stylings are based on comedian Ed Wynn, and his physical mannerisms are modeled from Wynn's Mad Hatter character in Alice in Wonderland.
 Mindy Kaling as Taffyta Muttonfudge, a racer in Sugar Rush who thinks that Vanellope is a mistake.
 Joe Lo Truglio as Markowski, a soldier from Hero's Duty that Ralph meets in Tapper.
 Ed O'Neill as Mr. Stan Litwak, owner of Litwak's Family Fun Center & Arcade.
 Dennis Haysbert as General Hologram, a holographic general in Hero's Duty.
 Adam Carolla as Wynnchel, a Long John who is a member of the Sugar Rush police department.
 Horatio Sanz as Duncan, a doughnut who is a member of the Sugar Rush police department.
 Rich Moore as Sour Bill, King Candy's sour ball henchman.

The cast also includes the Fix-It Felix Jr. Nicelanders, Edie McClurg as Mary, Raymond S. Persi as Mayor Gene, Jess Harnell as Don, Rachael Harris as Deanna, and Skylar Astin as Roy; Katie Lowes as Candlehead, Jamie Elman as Rancis Fluggerbutter, Josie Trinidad as Jubileena Bing-Bing, and Cymbre Walk as Crumbelina DiCaramello, racers in Sugar Rush; Phil Johnston as Surge Protector, Game Central Station security; Stefanie Scott as Moppet Girl, a young arcade-game player; John DiMaggio as Beard Papa, the security guard at the Sugar Rush candy-kart factory; Raymond Persi as a Zombie, Brian Kesinger as a Cyborg (based on Kano from Mortal Kombat) and Martin Jarvis as Saitine, a devil-like villain, who attends the Bad-Anon support group; Tucker Gilmore as the Sugar Rush Announcer; Brandon Scott as Kohut, a soldier in Hero's Duty; and Tim Mertens as Dr. Brad Scott, a scientist who is Sgt. Calhoun's deceased fiancé in Hero's Duty (voiced by Nick Grimshaw in the UK version but not in the UK home release).

The film features several cameos from real-world video game characters including: Tapper (Maurice LaMarche), the bartender from Tapper; Sonic the Hedgehog (Roger Craig Smith); Ryu (Kyle Hebert), Ken Masters (Reuben Langdon), M. Bison (Gerald C. Rivers), and Zangief (Rich Moore) from Street Fighter II; Clyde (Kevin Deters) from Pac-Man; and Yuni Verse (Jamie Sparer Roberts) from Dance Dance Revolution (specifically X2).

A character modeled after dubstep musician Skrillex makes an appearance in the fictional Fix-It Felix Jr. as the DJ at the anniversary party of the game.

Video game cameos and references

In addition to the spoken roles, Wreck-It Ralph contains a number of other video game references, including characters and visual gags. The video game villains at the support meeting, in addition to those mentioned above, include Bowser from the Mario franchise, Doctor Eggman from Sonic the Hedgehog, and Neff from Altered Beast.
Additionally, the game cabinet of the fictional Fix It Felix, Jr. arcade game is stylized to strongly resemble the cabinet of Nintendo's original 1981 Donkey Kong arcade game, with Ralph and Felix taking similar poses as Donkey Kong and Mario, respectively. The Hero's Duty game is a reference to the hugely successful first-person shooter games Halo and Call of Duty.
Characters from Q*bert are shown as "homeless" characters and later taken in by Ralph and Felix into their game (Q*bert also speaks to Felix at one point using the signature synthesized gibberish and word-balloon symbols from his game, called Q*bert-ese). Scenes in Game Central Station and Tapper's bar include Chun-Li, Cammy and Blanka from Street Fighter, Pac-Man, Blinky, Pinky, and Inky from Pac-Man, the Paperboy from Paperboy, the two paddles and the ball from Pong, Dig Dug, a Pooka, and a Fygar from Dig Dug, The Qix from Qix, Frogger from Frogger, and Peter Pepper from BurgerTime. Lara Croft and Mario are also mentioned.

Additional references are based on sight gags. The residents of Niceland and the bartender from Tapper are animated using a jerky motion that spoofs the limited animation cycles of the sprites of many eight- and sixteen-bit arcade games. King Candy uses the Konami Code on an NES controller to access the programming of Sugar Rush. Throughout Game Central Station is graffiti that includes "Aerith lives" (referencing the character of Aerith Gainsborough from Final Fantasy VII), "All your base are belong to us" (an Engrish phrase popularized from the game Zero Wing), "Sheng Long Was Here" (referencing an April Fool's joke around a made-up character Sheng Long from Street Fighter), and "Jenkins" (a nod to the popular Leeroy Jenkins meme from World of Warcraft). There is also a reference to the Metal Gear series when Ralph is searching for a medal in Tapper's Lost and found, finding first a Super Mushroom from the Mario franchise, and then Metal Gear Solids "Exclamation point" (with the corresponding sound effect from the game). Mr. Litwak wears a black and white striped referee's shirt, a nod to the iconic outfit of Twin Galaxies founder Walter Day. One of the songs in the credits is an original work from Buckner and Garcia, previously famous for writing video game-themed songs in the 1980s. The Walt Disney Animation Studios opening logo is animated in an 8-bit pixelated fashion, whereas the Walt Disney Pictures closing production logo appears in a glitched state, a reference to the kill screen from many early arcade games such as Pac-Man. The high score on the main screen of Fix-It Felix, Jr., 120501, refers to the birthdate of Walt Disney, December 5, 1901.

Production

Concept and story
The concept of Wreck-It Ralph was first developed at Disney, in the late 1980s, under the working title High Score. Since then, it was redeveloped and reconsidered several times: In the late 1990s, it took on the working title Joe Jump, then in the mid-2000s as Reboot Ralph.

John Lasseter, the head of Walt Disney Animation Studios and executive producer of the film, describes Wreck-It Ralph as "an 8-bit video-game bad guy who travels the length of the arcade to prove that he's a good guy." In a manner similar to Who Framed Roger Rabbit and the Toy Story films, Wreck-It Ralph featured cameo appearances by a number of licensed video-game characters. For example, one scene from the film shows Ralph attending a support group for the arcade's various villain characters, including Clyde from Pac-Man, Doctor Eggman from Sonic the Hedgehog, and Bowser from Super Mario Bros. Rich Moore, the film's director, had determined that for a film about a video-game world to feel authentic, "it had to have real characters from real games in it." Moore aimed to add licensed characters in a similar manner as cultural references in Looney Tunes shorts, but considered "having the right balance so a portion of the audience didn't feel they were being neglected or talked down to." However, Moore avoided creating the movie around existing characters, feeling that "there's so much mythology and baggage attached to pre-existing titles that I feel someone would be disappointed," and considered this to be a reason why movies based on video game franchises typically fail. Instead, for Ralph, the development of new characters representative of the 8-bit video game was "almost like virgin snow," giving them the freedom to take these characters in new directions.

Before production, the existing characters were added to the story either in places they would make sense to appear or as cameos from a list of characters suggested by the film's creative team, without consideration if they would legally be able to use the characters. The company then sought out the copyright holders' permissions to use the characters, as well as working with these companies to assure their characters were being represented authentically. In the case of Nintendo, the writers had early on envisioned the Bad-anon meeting with Bowser as a major character within the scene; according to Moore, Nintendo was very positive towards this use, stating in Moore's own words, "If there is a group that is dedicated to helping the bad guy characters in video games then Bowser must be in that group!" Nintendo had asked that the producers try to devise a scene that would be similarly appropriate for Mario for his inclusion in the film. Despite knowing they would be able to use the character, the producers could not find an appropriate scene that would let Mario be a significant character without taking away the spotlight from the main story and opted to not include the character. Moore debunked a rumor that Mario and his brother character Luigi were not included due to Nintendo requesting too high a licensing fee, stating that the rumor grew out of a joke John C. Reilly made at Comic-Con.
Dr. Wily from Mega Man was going to appear but was cut from the final version of the film. Overall, there are about 188 individual character models in the movie as a result of these cameo inclusions.

An earlier draft of the screenplay had Ralph and Vanellope spending time going around the game world to collect the pieces for her kart for Sugar Rush, and at times included Felix traveling with the pair. During these scenes, Ralph would have lied to Felix regarding his budding relationship with Calhoun, leading eventually to Ralph becoming depressed and abandoning his quest to get his medal back. At this point, a fourth game world, Extreme Easy Living 2, would have been introduced and was considered a "hedonistic place" between the social nature of The Sims and the open-world objective-less aspects of Grand Theft Auto, according to Moore. Ralph would go there too, wallowing in his depression, and would find happiness by gaining "Like It" buttons for doing acceptable actions in the party-like nature of the place. Moore stated that while it was difficult to consider dropping this new game world, they found that its introduction in the second half of the film would be too difficult a concept for the viewer to grasp. They further had trouble working out how a social game would be part of an arcade, and though they considered having the game be running on Litwak's laptop, they ultimately realized that justifying the concept would be too convoluted. Line art sketches and voice-over readings of the scene were included on the home media release of the film.

Animation, designs, and camera work
The film introduced Disney's new bidirectional reflectance distribution functions, with more realistic reflections on surfaces, and new virtual cinematography Camera Capture system, which makes it possible to go through scenes in real time. To research the Sugar Rush segment of the film, the visual development group traveled to trade fair ISM Cologne, a See's Candy factory, and other manufacturing facilities. The group also brought in food photographers, to demonstrate techniques to make food appear appealing. Special effects, including from "smoke or dust," looks distinct in each of the segments.

Music

The film's score was composed by Henry Jackman. Three original songs were performed in the film by Owl City, AKB48, and Buckner & Garcia. The soundtrack also features the songs "Celebration", "Bug Hunt" (Skrillex and Noisia remix), and "Shut Up and Drive". Early in the development process, Robert Lopez and Kristen Anderson-Lopez wrote an original song for the film; it was later cut out.

Marketing

A teaser trailer for Wreck-It Ralph was released on June 6, 2012, debuting with Madagascar 3: Europe's Most Wanted and Rock of Ages. This also coincided with the 2012 Electronic Entertainment Expo, for which Disney constructed a mock aged arcade cabinet for the fictional Fix-It Felix Jr. game on display on the show floor. Disney also released a browser-based Flash-based version of the Fix-It Felix Jr. game as well as iOS, Android, and Windows Phone versions, with online Unity-based versions of Sugar Rush and Hero's Duty. A second trailer for the film was released on September 12, 2012, coinciding with Finding Nemo 3D and Frankenweenie, along with its final updated movie poster.

To promote the home media release of Wreck-It Ralph, director Rich Moore produced a short film titled Garlan Hulse: Where Potential Lives. Set within the movie's universe, the mockumentary film was designed as a parody of The King of Kong.

Release

Theatrical
The film was originally scheduled for a release on March 22, 2013, but it was later changed to November 2, 2012, due to it being ahead of schedule. The theatrical release was accompanied by Disney's animated short film, Paperman.

Home media
Wreck-It Ralph was released on Blu-ray Disc (2D and 3D) and DVD in North America on March 5, 2013, from Walt Disney Studios Home Entertainment. The film was made available for digital download in selected regions on February 12, 2013. Wreck-It Ralph debuted at No. 1 in Blu-ray and DVD sales in the United States. Wreck It Ralph was released on 4K UHD Blu-ray on November 6, 2018.

Reception

Box office
Wreck-It Ralph grossed $189.4 million in North America and $281.8 million in other countries, for a worldwide total of $496.5 million.

In North America, the film debuted with $13.5 million, an above-average opening-day gross for an animated film released in November. During its opening weekend, the film topped the box office with $49 million, making it the largest opening for a Walt Disney Animation Studios film at the time. The film fell 33% to $33 million in its second weekend, finishing second behind newcomer Skyfall.

Critical response
The site's consensus reads: "Equally entertaining for both kids and parents old enough to catch the references, Wreck-It Ralph is a clever, colorful adventure built on familiar themes and joyful nostalgia." On Metacritic the film has a weighted average score of 72 out of 100, based on 38 critics, indicating "generally favorable reviews". The film earned an "A" from audiences polled by CinemaScore.

Roger Ebert of the Chicago Sun-Times gave the film 3 out of 4 stars and wrote, "More than in most animated films, the art design and color palette of Wreck-It Ralph permit unlimited sets, costumes, and rules, giving the movie tireless originality and different behavior in every different cyber world." A. O. Scott of The New York Times wrote, "The movie invites a measure of cynicism—which it proceeds to obliterate with a 93-minute blast of color, noise, ingenuity and fun." Peter Debruge of Variety stated, "With plenty to appeal to boys and girls, old and young, Walt Disney Animation Studios has a high-scoring hit on its hands in this brilliantly conceived, gorgeously executed toon, earning bonus points for backing nostalgia with genuine emotion." Betsy Sharkey of the Los Angeles Times said, "The movie's subversive sensibility and old-school/new-school feel are a total kick," while Justin Lowe of The Hollywood Reporter wrote, "With a mix of retro eye-candy for grown-ups and a thrilling, approachable storyline for the tykes, the film casts a wide and beguiling net." Conversely, Christopher Orr of The Atlantic found it "overplotted and underdeveloped."

Awards and nominations

Franchise

Sequel

Ralph Breaks the Internet is the sequel to Wreck-It Ralph. The film follows Ralph and Von Schweetz as they travel to the Internet to get a replacement part for Sugar Rush and prevent Mr. Litwak from disposing of the game. The film was produced by Walt Disney Animation Studios with Moore and Johnston directing. The film was released November 21, 2018 by Walt Disney Pictures.

Video games
In addition to the Flash version of the Fix-It Felix Jr. game, Disney released a tie-in side-scrolling platform game called Wreck-It Ralph for the Wii, Nintendo 3DS, and Nintendo DS, to mostly negative reviews. The arcade style side-scrolling game was developed by PipeWorks and published by Activision and serves as a "story extension" to the film; it is the first Disney video game since Disney's Extreme Skate Adventure to be published by Activision. Taking place following the events of the film, players may play as Wreck-It Ralph or Fix-It Felix, causing or repairing damage, respectively, following another Cy-Bug incident. Game levels are based on the locations in the film like the Fix-It Felix Jr., Hero's Duty, and Sugar Rush games as well as Game Central Station. It was released in conjunction with the film's release, in November 2012.

In October 2012, Disney released fully playable browser-based versions of the Hero's Duty and Sugar Rush games on the new official film site. A mobile game titled Wreck-it Ralph was released in November 2012 for iOS and Android systems, with a Windows Phone 8 version following almost a year later. Initially, the game consisted of three mini-games, Fix-it Felix Jr., Hero's Duty and Sweet Climber, which were later joined by Turbo Time and Hero's Duty: Flight Command. The game was retired on August 29, 2014.

Ralph also appears in Sega's Sonic & All-Stars Racing Transformed as a playable guest character.

Ralph and Vanellope appear as playable characters in Disney Infinity as well (voiced by Brian T. Delaney and Sarah Silverman, respectively); the Disney Store released their individual figures on January 7, 2014. A combo "toy box pack" of the two figures with Sugar Rush customization discs was released April 1, 2014, from the Disney Store.

Wreck-It Ralph is a playable world on the mobile game Disney Crossy Road. Ralph made his debut appearance in the Kingdom Hearts video game series in Kingdom Hearts III, serving as a Link summon. A world based on Wreck-It Ralph was added to the mobile game Kingdom Hearts Union χ as part of an update in April 2019. In the game, the story of the world loosely follows the plot of the film, culminating with a boss battle against Turbo.

Ralph, Vanellope, Calhoun and Felix appear in the mobile game Disney Heroes: Battle Mode as characters. Ralph and Vanellope are the first unlocked characters.

Ralph, Vanellope, Calhoun and Felix appear as playable characters to unlock for a limited time in Disney Magic Kingdoms, as well as Niceland as an attraction.

Further reading

References

External links

 
 
 Wreck-It Ralph at Walt Disney Animation Studios
 

 
2012 films
2012 3D films
2012 computer-animated films
2012 directorial debut films
2012 action comedy films
2010s American animated films
2010s buddy comedy films
2010s fantasy comedy films
American action comedy films
American buddy comedy films
American children's animated comic science fiction films
American children's animated science fantasy films
American computer-animated films
Animated films about auto racing
Animated films about friendship
American animated feature films
Animated buddy films
Annie Award winners
Best Animated Feature Annie Award winners
Best Animated Feature Broadcast Film Critics Association Award winners
Animated crossover films
2010s English-language films
Films directed by Rich Moore
Films scored by Henry Jackman
Animated films about children
Metafictional works
Films about video games
Works set in computers
Films about parallel universes
Walt Disney Animation Studios films
Walt Disney Pictures animated films
Films with screenplays by Phil Johnston (filmmaker)
Films with screenplays by Jennifer Lee (filmmaker)
Films with screenplays by Jim Reardon
Films about prejudice
2010s children's animated films
3D animated films
2012 animated films
2012 comedy films
Films produced by Clark Spencer